Aug-Radisch is a former municipality in the district of Südoststeiermark in Austrian state of Styria. Since the 2015 Styria municipal structural reform, it is part of the municipality Gnas.

Population

References

Cities and towns in Südoststeiermark District